Alexander Loyd (also Alexander Lloyd) (August 19, 1805 – May 7, 1872) served one term as mayor of Chicago, Illinois from 1840 until 1841 for the Democratic Party.

Early life and career
Loyd was born in Orange County, New York. He arrived in Chicago in 1833, and opened a shop. Within four years, he was considered a principal contractor, carpenter and builder in Chicago.

He was elected to the Chicago Board of Trustees in 1835. By then, he was a member of the volunteer Fire Department, and became Chief Engineer in 1838, serving for one year.

Mayoralty
Loyd became the 4th Mayor of Chicago in 1840, defeating incumbent Whig Benjamin Wright Raymond.

Lloyd was sworn in as mayor on March 9, 1840.

His mayoralty ended on March 4, 1841, when he was succeeded in office by fellow Democrat Francis Cornwall Sherman.

Post-mayoralty
He served as a Trustee of the 2nd district of the Chicago Schools in 1842.
When G. W. Snow, alderman of the 2nd ward, resigned in 1850. Loyd was elected to finish Snow's term, serving for one year.

He died in 1872, of "rheumatism of the heart" and was buried in Rosehill Cemetery.

References

External links
 Inaugural Address
 Grave at Rosehill Cemetery

1805 births
1872 deaths
Burials at Rosehill Cemetery
Mayors of Chicago
19th-century American politicians
Chicago City Council members